Nikon mount may refer to:

Nikon 1-mount, a mirrorless digital camera lens mount since 2011
Nikon F-mount, a 35mm film and digital SLR lens mount since 1959
Nikon S-mount, a 35mm film rangefinder lens mount between 1948 and 2005

See also
Kodak F-mount
Fujifilm F-mount